The 2010 Armed Forces Bowl was the eighth edition of the college football bowl game, and the first of two editions to be played at Gerald J. Ford Stadium on the campus of Southern Methodist University (SMU) in the Dallas enclave of University Park, Texas. From the bowl's inception as the Fort Worth Bowl in 2003, it had been held at Amon G. Carter Stadium on the campus of Texas Christian University, but a renovation project that began immediately after the 2010  regular season led to a temporary move to the SMU campus. The event returned to TCU in 2012.

The game started at 12:00 PM US EST on Thursday, December 30, 2010. The game was telecast on ESPN and matched the SMU Mustangs from Conference USA, playing on their home field, with the Army Black Knights.

Army's appearance in the 2010 edition of the game marked the fourth consecutive year that a service academy played in the bowl.  Air Force competed in the contest in 2007, 2008, and 2009.

Teams

Army Black Knights

Army officially accepted an invitation to the bowl on November 30, 2010.  The Black Knights had a contingency agreement with the AF Bowl to compete in the game if Conference USA or the Mountain West Conference could not fill their bowl obligation.  Since TCU was invited to a BCS Bowl and the Mountain West only had 4 other bowl eligible teams to fill 5 bowl games, the spot opened up for Army to be invited.  For Army, this was their first bowl appearance since 1996 when they played in the Independence Bowl against Auburn.  The 2010 game was the first time Army played in the Armed Forces Bowl.

SMU Mustangs

SMU made their second straight bowl appearance after not appearing in a bowl game since 1984, before the program was devastated by scandal.  The Mustangs entered the game with a 7-6 record and were co-champions of Conference USA's West Division.  SMU defeated Nevada in last season's Hawaii Bowl by a score of 45-10.  This was SMU's first appearance in the Armed Forces Bowl.  The game was played at the Mustangs' home stadium after the contest was moved to Gerald Ford Stadium due to construction on TCU's Amon G. Carter Stadium.

Game summary

Scoring

Statistics

Game notes
Although both Army and SMU have been members of Conference USA, the teams have only played each other two previous times.  This is mainly because their tenures in the Conference have not overlapped.  Army was a member of the conference from 1997-2004 while SMU is a current member who started conference membership in 2005.  Army has won the previous two meetings with the Black Knights winning a 14–13 decision at West Point in 1928 and picking up a 24–6 win at SMU in 1967.

References

Armed Forces Bowl
Armed Forces Bowl
Army Black Knights football bowl games
SMU Mustangs football bowl games
Armed Forces Bowl
Armed Forces Bowl